Nyer Lake is a plateau lake in Gê'gyai County, Tibet Autonomous Region, southwest of China. The lake has a total area of about 33 square kilometers. Lying nearly 4,399 metres above sea level.

Economics
Nyer Lake is a salt lake. Tibet Mineral Development owns a license to extract boron and magnesium from the lake since 2008. However, the company has not done so deeming it not yet economical.

References

Nyer